The following lists events from 1995 in China.

Incumbents
 People’s Republic of China (Mainland China)
 Party General Secretary: Jiang Zemin 
 President: Jiang Zemin
 Vice President: Rong Yiren
 Premier: Li Peng
 Vice Premier: Zhu Rongji
 Republic of China (Taiwan, Penghu, Kinmen, Mazu and the other islands)
 President: Lee Teng-hui
 Vice President: Lee Yuan-tsu

Governors  
 Governor of Anhui Province – Hui Liangyu 
 Governor of Fujian Province – Chen Mingyi then He Guoqiang 
 Governor of Gansu Province – Zhang Wule then Sun Ying 
 Governor of Guangdong Province – Zhu Senlin then Lu Ruihua 
 Governor of Guizhou Province – Chen Shineng then Wu Yixia
 Governor of Hainan Province – Ruan Chongwu 
 Governor of Hebei Province – Ye Liansong 
 Governor of Heilongjiang Province – Tian Fengshan 
 Governor of Henan Province – Ma Zhongchen 
 Governor of Hubei Province – Jia Zhijie then Jiang Zhuping 
 Governor of Hunan Province – Chen Bangzhu then Yang Zhengwu
 Governor of Jiangsu Province – Zheng Silin 
 Governor of Jiangxi Province – Wu Guanzheng then Shu Shengyou 
 Governor of Jilin Province – Gao Yan then Wang Yunkun
 Governor of Liaoning Province – Wen Shizhen 
 Governor of Qinghai Province – Tian Chengping 
 Governor of Shaanxi Province – Cheng Andong 
 Governor of Shandong Province – Zhao Zhihao then Li Chunting
 Governor of Shanxi Province – Sun Wensheng 
 Governor of Sichuan Province – Xiao Yang then Song Baorui 
 Governor of Yunnan Province – Li Jiating 
 Governor of Zhejiang Province – Wan Xueyuan

Events

January
January 22 – Miss Chinese International Pageant 1995 Finals.

February
February 10 – BYD Group founded in Shenzhen, Guangdong Province.

March
 March 3 — Taiwan implements National Health Insurance (NHI).

April

April 16 to November 19 – Chinese Jia-A League 1995 was held.

July

July 21 – Third Taiwan Strait Crisis begins.

September

 September 4 to 15 – The United Nations convened Fourth World Conference on Women in Beijing.
 September 18 – BBK Electronics founded in Dongguan, Guangdong Province.

November

November 16 to November 26 – The 1995 World Weightlifting Championships took place in Guangzhou, China.

December
 December 2 – 1995 Republic of China legislative election was held.

Unknown date
 Mengniu Dairy, founded by Niu Gensheng in Inner Mongolia Autonomous Region.

Births
February 10 - Yang Zhaoxuan, tennis player
August 3 – Li Haotong, professional golfer

Death
 April 13 — Lang Jingshan, Chinese photojournalist (born 1892)
 May 8 — Teresa Teng, Chinese pop singer. (born 1953).

See also
List of Chinese films of 1995
List of Hong Kong films of 1995
See also:Category:1995 Establishments in China

References

 
Years of the 20th century in China
China
1990s in China